Villa del Carmen or Carmen is a town in Durazno Department of central Uruguay, the third largest populated place in the department, after Durazno and Sarandí del Yí.

Geography

History
Carmen was founded on 10 June 1874 by a decree of President of Uruguay, José Eugenio Ellauri. A principal contribution to the town's economic development was the carpentery industry, as well as the wines produced by André Faraud in the beginning of the 20th century.

On 4 July 1908, its status was elevated to "Pueblo" (village) and was given the name "Pueblo del Carmen" by the Act of Ley Nº 3.305. On 29 April 1975, its status was raised to "Villa" (town) by the Act of Ley Nº 14.363.

Population
In 2011, Villa del Carmen had a population of 2,692.
 
Source: Instituto Nacional de Estadística de Uruguay

Noted features
Parque Francisco Davant is named after Francisco Davant, a local political figure distinguished by his sponsorship of tree planting, serves local residents and tourists. The park contains a variety of trees, the planting of which date from the 1950s.

Places of worship
 Parish Church of Our Lady of Mt. Carmel (Roman Catholic)

References

External links
 INE map of Carmen

Populated places in the Durazno Department